Kanhaiya Wadhawan (born 27 September 2001) is an Indian cricketer. He made his first-class debut for Jammu & Kashmir in the 2018–19 Ranji Trophy on 30 December 2018.

References

External links
 

2001 births
Living people
Indian cricketers
Jammu and Kashmir cricketers
Place of birth missing (living people)